This is a list of winners of NME Awards.

Winners by Year

NME Awards 1953
Dance Band: Ted Heath And His Music
Female Vocalist: Lita Roza
Outstanding Musician: Ronnie Scott
Small Band: Johnny Dankworth Seven
Male Vocalist: Dickie Valentine

NME Awards 1954
Band You Would Most Like To See At The NME Pollwinners' Concert : Johnny Dankworth's Orchestra
Outstanding Drummer: Jack Parnell
Outstanding Clarinet Player: Carl Barriteau
Outstanding Tenor Sax Player: Ronnie Scott
Outstanding Trombone Player: Don Lusher
Outstanding Alto Sax Player: Johnny Dankworth
Outstanding Guitar Player: Ivor Mairants
Outstanding Piano Player: Bill McGuffie
Outstanding Trumpet Player: Kenny Baker
Outstanding Bass Player: Johnny Hawksworth
Outstanding Arranger: Reg Owen
Outstanding Large Band: Ted Heath And His Music
Musician Of The Year: Ronnie Scott
Male Vocalist: Dickie Valentine
Female Vocalist: Lita Roza
Small Band: Ronnie Scott's Band

NME Awards 1955
Outstanding American Feminine Singer: Doris Day
The World's Outstanding Musical Personality: Bill Haley
Top Male Singer: Dickie Valentine
Outstanding American Male Singer: Frank Sinatra
Outstanding British Musical Personality: Dickie Valentine
World's Outstanding Singer: Frank Sinatra
Outstanding British Feminine Singer: Alma Cogan
Outstanding British Male Singer: Dickie Valentine
World's Outstanding Vocal Group: Four Aces
Large Band Section: Ted Heath And His Music
Favourite Disc Jockey: Jack Jackson
Small Bands: The Kirchins
British Vocal Group: Stargazers

NME Awards 1956
Large Band: Ted Heath
Small Band: The Kirchins
Musician Of The Year: Eddie Calvert
Favourite American Singer- Female: Doris Day
Favourite American Singer- Male : Frank Sinatra
Female Dance Band Vocalist: Rose Brennan
Male Solo Singing Star: Dickie Valentine
Female Solo Singing Star: Ruby Murray
Favourite Musical Personality: Dickie Valentine
Most Promising New Band: Ronnie Scott
Vocal Group: Stargazers
Male Dance Band Vocalist: Robbie Britton
Outstanding Popular Singer In The World: Frank Sinatra

NME Awards 1957
Favourite American Female Singer: Doris Day
World's Outstanding Popular Singer: Pat Boone
Favourite American Male Singer: Pat Boone
Favourite British Female Singer: Alma Cogan
World's Outstanding Vocal Group: The Platters
British Large Bands: Ted Heath
Favourite British Male Singer: Dickie Valentine
British Musical Personality: Tommy Steele
World's Outstanding Musical Personality: Elvis Presley
British Vocal Groups: King Brothers
British Disc Jockey: Jack Jackson
Small Groups (Skiffle): Lonnie Donegan
Small Groups (Traditional) : Chris Barber
Small Groups (Modern Jazz): Tony Kinsey

NME Awards 1958
Favourite US Female Singer: Connie Francis
World's Outstanding Popular Singer: Elvis Presley
Favourite US Male Singer: Elvis Presley
World's Outstanding Vocal Group: Everly Brothers
World's Outstanding Musical Personality: Elvis Presley
Outstanding Vocal Personality: Frankie Vaughan
Favourite Male Singer: Frankie Vaughan
Small Group: Lonnie Donegan
Favourite Female Singer: Alma Cogan
Vocal Group: Mudlarks
Outstanding Instrumental Personality: Eddie Calvert
Large Band: Ted Heath
Favourite New Singer (Under 21): Cliff Richard
Favourite Disc Jockey: Pete Murray

NME Awards 1959
World's Outstanding Male Singer: Elvis Presley
World's Outstanding Female Singer: Connie Francis
World's Outstanding Musical Personality: Elvis Presley
World's Outstanding Vocal Group: Everly Brothers
Favourite British Male Singer: Cliff Richard
Favourite British Female Singer: Shirley Bassey
Favourite British Vocal Group: The Mudlarks
Favourite British Vocal Personality: Frankie Vaughan
Favourite British Instrumentalist: Russ Conway
Favourite British Large Band or Orchestra: Ted Heath
Favourite British Small Group: Lonnie Donegan
Favourite British Disc Jockey: Pete Murray
Favourite British New Disc or TV singer: Craig Douglas
Favourite British Disc Of Year: Cliff Richard's 'Living Doll'
Favourite British Artist for Poll Concert: Marty Wilde

NME Awards 1960
World Male Singer: Elvis Presley
World Female Singer: Connie Francis
World Vocal Group: Everly Brothers
World Musical Personality: Duane Eddy
British Vocal Group: King Brothers
British Large Band Or Orchestra: Ted Heath
British Female Singer: Shirley Bassey
British Male Singer: Cliff Richard
British Vocal Personality: Lonnie Donegan
British Small Group: The Shadows
Best British Disc Of The Year: The Shadows 'Apache'
New Disc or TV Singer: Emile Ford
Instrumental Personality: Russ Conway
Artist For Poll Concert: Adam Faith
Disc Jockey: David Jacobs

NME Awards 1961
World Female Singer: Connie Francis
World Musical Personality: Elvis Presley
World Male Singer: Elvis Presley
World Vocal Group: Everly Brothers
British Vocal Personality: Adam Faith
British Vocal Group: The Springfields
Instrumental Personality: Bert Weedon
British Small Group: The Shadows
British Large Band or Orchestra: Ted Heath
Best British Disc of the Year: John Leyton's 'Johnny Remember Me'
British Male Singer: Cliff Richard
Artist For Poll Concert: Billy Fury
Trad Jazz Band: Acker Bilk
British Female Singer: Helen Shapiro
New Disc or TV Singer: John Leyton
Disc Jockey: David Jacobs

NME Awards 1962
World's Outstanding Male Singer: Elvis Presley
World's Outstanding Female Singer: Brenda Lee
World's Outstanding Vocal Group: Everly Brothers
World's Outstanding Musical Personality: Elvis Presley
British Male Singer: Cliff Richard
British Female Singer: Helen Shapiro
British Vocal Group: The Springfields
British Vocal Personality: Joe Brown
British Solo Instrumentalist: Jet Harris
British Large Band/ Orchestra: Joe Loss
British Small Group: The Shadows
British Traditional Jazz Band: Kenny Ball
British Disc Jockey: David Jacobs
British New Disc or TV Singer: Frank Ifield
British Best Disc in 1962: Frank Ifield's 'I Remember You'
Artist for Poll Concert: Billy Fury

NME Awards 1963
Host: Roger Moore

World Male Singer: Cliff Richard
World Vocal Group: The Beatles
World Musical Personality: Elvis Presley
World Female Singer: Brenda Lee
British Vocal Personality: Joe Brown
British Vocal Group: The Beatles
British Large Band Or Orchestra: Joe Loss
British Small Group: The Shadows
British Traditional Jazz Band: Kenny Ball
Best British Disc Of The Year: The Beatles 'She Loves You'
British Female Singer: Kathy Kirby
Artist For Poll Concert: Billy J Kramer and The Dakotas
British Male Singer: Cliff Richard
Disc Jockey: David Jacobs
New Disc or TV Singer: Gerry Marsden
Solo Instrumentalist: Jet Harris

NME Awards 1964
Host: Roy Orbison

Outstanding Male Singer: Elvis Presley
Outstanding Female Singer: Brenda Lee
Outstanding Vocal Group: The Beatles
Outstanding Musical Personality: Elvis Presley
British Male Singer: Cliff Richard
British Female Singer: Dusty Springfield
British Vocal Group: The Beatles
British Vocal Personality: Cliff Richard
British Rhythm and Blues: The Rolling Stones
British Instrumental Unit: The Shadows
British TV Or Radio Programme: Ready Steady Go!
British Disc Jockey: Jimmy Savile
British New Disc or TV Singer: Mick Jagger
British Disc This Year: The Animals 'The House of the Rising Sun'

NME Awards 1965
Host: Tony Bennett

World Male Singer: Elvis Presley
World Musical Personality: Elvis Presley
British R & B Group: The Rolling Stones
Disc Jockey: Jimmy Savile
World Female Singer: Dusty Springfield
World Vocal Group: The Beatles
British Vocal Group: The Beatles
British Male Singer: Cliff Richard
British Vocal Personality: John Lennon
British Female Singer: Dusty Springfield
New Disc Or TV Singer: Donovan
British Instrumental Unit: The Shadows
Best New Group: Seekers
Most Popular Disc Jockey: Jimmy Savile
Best TV or Radio Show: Top of the Pops
Best New Disc Of The Year: The Rolling Stones '(I Can't Get No) Satisfaction'

NME Awards 1966
Host: Jimmy Savile

World Male Singer: Elvis Presley
World Female Singer: Dusty Springfield
World Vocal Group: The Beach Boys
World Musical Personality: Elvis Presley
British Vocal Group: The Beatles
British Instrumental Unit: The Shadows
Best Male Singer: Cliff Richard
British Vocal Personality: Cliff Richard
Best R&B Group: Spencer Davis
Best TV/Radio Show: 'Top of the Pops'
Top Disc Jockey: Jimmy Savile
British Female Singer: Dusty Springfield
New Disc Singer: Stevie Winwood
Best New Group: Spencer Davis
Best British Disc This Year: The Beatles - 'Eleanor Rigby'

NME Awards 1967
Host: Jimmy Savile

World's Top Vocal Group: The Beatles
Best R & B Group: The Rolling Stones
Britain's Top Singer: Cliff Richard
World's Top Female Singer: Dusty Springfield
Top DJs: Jimmy Savile
Top TV Show: 'Top of the Pops'
Best New Singer: Englebert Humperdinck
Best New Group: Bee Gees

NME Awards 1968
Host: Roger Moore

World Male Singer: Elvis Presley
World Female Singer: Lulu
World Vocal Group: The Beatles
World Musical Personality: Elvis Presley
British Vocal Group: The Beatles
British Female Singer: Lulu
Top Disc Jockey: Jimmy Savile
Best TV/ Radio Show: 'Top of The Pops'
Best New Group: Love Affair
British Vocal Personality: Cliff Richard
British R & B Group: The Rolling Stones
Best British Disc This Year: The Beatles - 'Hey Jude'
British Male Singer: Tom Jones
New Disc Singer: Mary Hopkin
British Instrumental Unit: The Shadows

NME Awards 1969
Host: Jimmy Savile

NME Awards 1970
World Male Singer: Elvis Presley
World Female Singer: Diana Ross
1970s Best British Single: Mungo Jerry - 'In The Summertime'
World Musical Personality: Elvis Presley
Best TV/ Radio Show: 'Top Of The Pops'
World Vocal Group: Creedence Clearwater Revival
British Vocal Personality: Cliff Richard
British Female Singer: Cilla Black
New Disc Singer: Elton John
Best New Group: McGuinness Flint
Top British Group: The Beatles
Brit. Instrumental Unit: The Shadows
Top Disc Jockey: Jimmy Savile
British Male Singer: Cliff Richard
1970s Best British LP: The Beatles - 'Let It Be'

NME Awards 1971
World Male Singer: Elvis Presley
World Female Singer: Diana Ross
World Musical Personality: Elvis Presley
World Vocal Group: Creedence Clearwater Revival
British Male Singer: Cliff Richard
British Female Singer: Cilla Black
Best British Single: Mungo Jerry - 'In the Summertime'
Best TV/ Radio Show: 'Top of the Pops'
British Vocal Personality: Cliff Richard
New Disc Singer: Elton John
Best New Group: McGuinness Flint
Top British Group: The Beatles
British Instrumental Unit: The Shadows
Top Disc Jockey: Jimmy Savile
Best British LP: The Beatles - 'Let It Be'

NME Awards 1972
World Male Singer: Elvis Presley
World Female Singer: Diana Ross
World Musical Personality: Elvis Presley
World Vocal Group: T. Rex
British Male Singer: Cliff Richard
British Female Singer: Cilla Black
British Vocal Group: T. Rex
British Vocal Personality: Cliff Richard
British New Group: New Seekers
British Instrumental Unit: CCS
TV or Radio Show: 'Top of the Pops'
Disc Jockey: Jimmy Savile
New Disc Singer: Rod Stewart
Best 1971 Single Disc: George Harrison - 'My Sweet Lord'
Best 1971 Album: A tie between T. Rex's 'Electric Warrior' and John Lennon's 'Imagine'

NME Awards 1973
World Top Group: Yes
World Stage Band: Alice Cooper
World Male Singer: David Bowie
World Female Singer: Diana Ross
Most Promising Name: Golden Earring
Soul Act: Stevie Wonder
British Top Group: Yes
British Male Singer: David Bowie
British Female Singer: Maggie Bell
Most Promising Name (British): Leo Sayer

NME Awards 1974
British Male Singer: David Bowie
British Female Singer: Maggie Bell
British Group: Yes
British Stage Band: Genesis
Most Promising New Name (British): Leo Sayer
Disc Jockey: John Peel
TV Show: 'Old Grey Whistle Test'
British Single: The Who - '5.15'
British Album: Pink Floyd - 'The Dark Side of the Moon'
Best Guitarist: Eric Clapton
Best Keyboardist: Rick Wakeman
Best Bass Guitarist: Paul McCartney
Best Drummer: Carl Palmer
Best Producer: David Bowie
Best Instrumentalist: Roy Wood
Best Songwriters: Elton John/ Bernie Taupin
Best Soul Act: Stevie Wonder
Best Dressed Album: Yes - 'Yessongs'
World Singer: David Bowie
World Female Singer: Diana Ross
World Group: Yes
World Stage Band: Alice Cooper
World Album: Pink Floyd - 'The Dark Side of the Moon'
World Single: Golden Earring - 'Radar Love'
World's Most Promising New Name: Golden Earring

NME Awards 1975
British Male Singer: Paul Rodgers
British Female Singer: Kiki Dee
British Group: Roxy Music
British Stage Band: Genesis
British Disc Jockey: Noel Edmonds
British Music TV Show: The Old Grey Whistle Test
Most Promising New Name: Bad Company
Music Radio Show: Alan Freeman Show
World Male Singer: Robert Plant
World Female Singer: Joni Mitchell
Drummer: Carl Palmer
Misc. Instrument: Mike Oldfield
Producer: Eddie Offord
Album: Rod Stewart -'Smiler'
Single: Bad Company - 'Can't Get Enough'
Best Dressed LP: Yes - 'Relayer'
Soul Act: Stevie Wonder
Klutz Of The Year: Steve Harley

NME Awards 1976
Best Group: Led Zeppelin
Best British Stage Band:  Queen
Best Female Singer: Linda Ronstadt
Turkey Of The Year: Sex Pistols
Best Male Singer: Robert Plant
Most Promising Emergent Act: Eddie and the Hot Rods
Best Keyboardist: Rick Wakeman
Best Drummer: John Bonham
Best Songwriter/ Composer: Bob Dylan
Best Television Show: 'The Old Grey Whistle Test'
Best Disc Jockey: John Peel
Most Missed Dead Act: Jimi Hendrix
Best Guitarist: Jimmy Page
Best Single: Thin Lizzy - 'The Boys Are Back In Town'
Best Album: Led Zeppelin - 'The Song Remains The Same'
Most Wonderful Human Being: Johnny Rotten
Best Miscellaneous Instrumentalist: Mike Oldfield
Best Radio Show: 'Alan Freeman's Saturday Show'
Best Dressed Sleeve: Led Zeppelin - 'The Song Remains The Same'
Best Bassist: Paul McCartney

NME Awards 1977
Best Group: Sex Pistols
Best New Group/Act: Tom Robinson
Male Singer: David Bowie
Female Singer: Julie Covington
Best Album: The Sex Pistols - 'Never Mind The Bollocks'
Best Single: The Sex Pistols - 'God Save The Queen'
Keyboards: Rick Wakeman
Drummer: Paul Cook
Misc. Instrument: Mike Oldfield
Disc Jockey: John Peel
Radio Show: John Peel Show
TV Show: 'The Old Grey Whistle Test'
Event Of The Year: Elvis dying
Most Wonderful Human Being: Johnny Rotten
Prat Of The Year: Freddie Mercury

NME Awards 1978
Best Male Singer: David Bowie
Best Female Singer: Debbie Harry
Best Album: The Jam - 'All Mod Cons'
Best Single: The Clash - '(White Man) In Hammersmith Palais'
Best Songwriter: Elvis Costello
Best Dressed Sleeve: The Rolling Stones - 'Some Girls'
Best Group: The Clash
Best New Group: Public Image Ltd
Best Guitarist: Mick Jones
Best Bassist: Jean Jacques Burnel
Best Keyboardist: Dave Greenfield
Best Drummer: Keith Moon
Best DJ: John Peel
Best Radio Show: John Peel Show
Best TV Show: 'Revolver'
Most Wonderful Human Being: Sid Vicious
Pin-Up Of The Year: Debbie Harry
Film: 'Close Encounters of the Third Kind'
Creep Of The Year: John Travolta

NME Awards 1979
Male Singer: Sting
Songwriter: Paul Weller
Best Group: The Jam
Guitarist: Paul Weller
Bassist: Bruce Foxton
Keyboards: Dave Greenfield
Drums: Rick Buckler
Female Singer: Kate Bush
Best New Act: The Specials
Most Wonderful Human Being: John Peel
Image Of The Year: Gary Numan
Creep Of The Year: Gary Numan
Single: The Specials - 'Gangsters'
Album: The Jam - 'Setting Sons'
TV Programme: 'Fawlty Towers'
Best Dressed Sleeve: Public Image Ltd - 'Metal Box'
Disc Jockey: John Peel
Radio Show: John Peel Show
Face Of The Decade: Johnny Rotten
Farce Of The Decade: Mod Revival
Film Of The Year: 'Quadrophenia'

NME Awards 1980
Best Group: The Jam
Best New Act: UB40
Best Male Singer: Paul Weller
Best Guitarist: Paul Weller
Best Drummer: Rick Buckler
Best Songwriter: Paul Weller
Best Bassist: Bruce Foxton
Best Keyboardist: Dave Greenfield
Best Other Instrumentalist: Saxa
Best Single: The Jam - 'Going Underground'
Best Album: The Jam - 'Sound Affects'
Best Dressed Sleeve: The Jam - 'Sound Affects'
Best Disc Jockey: John Peel
Best Dressed Person: Adam Ant
Haircut Of The Year: Eugene Reynolds
Most Wonderful Human Being: Paul Weller
Creep Of The Year: Margaret Thatcher
Event Of The Year: Death Of John Lennon
TV Programme: 'Not the Nine O'Clock News'
Movie Of The Year: 'The Elephant Man'

NME Awards 1981
Best Group: The Jam
Best New Act: Altered Images
Most Missed Person: John Lennon
Best Songwriter: Paul Weller
Best Female Singer: Siouxsie Sioux
Best Male Singer: David Bowie
Best Single: The Specials - 'Ghost Town'
Best LP: Echo & The Bunnymen - 'Heaven Up Here'
Best Dressed Sleeve: Echo & The Bunnymen - 'Heaven Up Here'
Best Guitarist: Paul Weller
Best Bassist: Bruce Foxton
Best Drummer: Rick Buckler
Best Keyboardist: Dave Greenfield
Best TV Programme: 'Coronation Street'
Best Radio Show: John Peel
Best Film: 'Gregory's Girl'
Most Wonderful Human Being: Paul Weller
Best Dressed Person: Michael Foot
Creep Of The Year: Adam Andy

NME Awards 1982
Best Group: The Jam
Best Male Singer: Paul Weller
Best Female Singer: Siouxsie Sioux
Creep Of The Year: Margaret Thatcher
Most Wonderful Human Being: Paul Weller
Best Songwriter: Paul Weller
Best Single: The Jam - 'Town Called Malice'
Best Longplayer: The Jam - 'The Gift'
Best Live Act: The Jam
Best Dancefloor Favourite: Wham! - 'Young Guns (Go for It)'
Best Dressed Sleeve: Siouxsie and the Banshees - 'A Kiss in the Dreamhouse'
Event Of The Year: The Jam Split
Best Dressed Male: Paul Weller
Best Dressed Female: Siouxsie Sioux
Best Haircut: Paul Weller
Best Electronics: Vince Clarke
Best Guitarist: Paul Weller
Best Bassist: Bruce Foxton
Best Drummer: Rick Buckler
Best Miscellaneous Instrument: The Emerald Express, Violin
Best Radio Show: John Peel
Best Music Video: Madness - 'House of Fun'
Best TV Show: 'The Young Ones'
Best Film: 'E.T. the Extra-Terrestrial'

NME Awards 1983
Best Group: New Order
Best New Act: The Smiths
Best Dressed Female: Siouxsie Sioux
Female Singer: Siouxsie Sioux
Songwriter: Elvis Costello
Male Singer: David Bowie
Best Dressed Male: David Bowie
Best Long Player: Elvis Costello - 'Punch the Clock'
Best Single: New Order - 'Blue Monday'
Best Film: 'Merry Christmas, Mr. Lawrence'
Best Promo Video: Michael Jackson - 'Thriller'
Most Wonderful Human Being: Paul Weller
Creep Of The Year: Margaret Thatcher
TV Show: 'The Tube'
Best Dressed Sleeve: New Order - 'Power, Corruption & Lies'
Best Radio Programme: John Peel
Best Guitarist: The Edge
Best Drummer: Budgie
Best Miscellaneous Musician: The TKO Horns
Best Bassist: Peter Hook
Best Keyboardist: Steve Nieve

NME Awards 1984
Best Group: The Smiths
Best New Act: Bronski Beat
Best Reggae Act: Smiley Culture
Best Soul Act: Womack & Womack
Best TV Show: 'The Tube'
Best Radio Show: John Peel
Best Single: Frankie Goes to Hollywood - 'Relax'
Best LP: Cocteau Twins - 'Treasure'
Best Dressed Sleeve: Frankie Goes to Hollywood - 'Welcome To The Pleasure Dome'
Promo Video: Frankie Goes to Hollywood - 'Two Tribes'
Best Film: 'Nineteen Eighty-Four'
Best Male Singer: Bono
Best Songwriter: Morrissey & Marr
Best Female Singer: Elizabeth Fraser
Best Instrumentalist: Johnny Marr
Best Dressed Person: Paul Weller
Creep Of The Year: Margaret Thatcher
Most Wonderful Human Being: Arthur Scargill

NME Awards 1985
Best Group: The Smiths
Best New Act: The Jesus and Mary Chain
Best Male Singer: Morrissey
Best Female Singer: Liz Fraser
Best Songwriter: Morrissey/Marr
Best Single: The Jesus and Mary Chain - 'Never Understand'
LP Of The Year: The Smiths - 'Meat Is Murder'
Best Soul/Funk Band: Cameo
Best Reggae Act: UB40
Best Live Act: The Pogues
Most Wonderful Human Being: Bob Geldof
Creep Of The Year: Margaret Thatcher
Best Dressed: Morrissey
Worst Dressed: Bob Geldof
Best Haircut: Morrissey
Worst Haircut: Feargal Sharkey
Biggest Mouth: Bob Geldof
Best Film: 'Letter to Brezhnev'
Best TV Programme: 'Whistle Test'
Best Radio Show: John Peel
Best Video: Talking Heads - 'Road to Nowhere'
Best Dressed Sleeve: The Pogues - 'Rum, Sodomy And The Lash'
Best Hype: The Jesus and Mary Chain

NME Awards 1986
Best Single: The Smiths - 'Panic'
Best LP: The Smiths - 'The Queen Is Dead'
Best Male Singer: Morrissey
Best Female Singer: Liz Fraser
Best Group: The Smiths
Most Wonderful Human Being: Morrissey
Best Club/Venue: Town & Country Club
Best Dance Record: Cameo - 'Word Up'
Threat Of The Year: AIDS
Sex Symbol: Joanne Whalley
Event Of The Year: 1986 FIFA World Cup
Best Film: 'Mona Lisa'
Best TV Show: 'The Singing Detective'
Creep Of The Year: Margaret Thatcher
Best New Music: The Housemartins
Best Radio Show: John Peel

NME Awards 1987
Best Group: The Smiths
Best Single: Prince - 'Sign O The Times'
Best LP: The Smiths - 'Strangeways Here We Come'
Male Singer: Morrissey
Best Female Singer: Suzanne Vega
Best New Act: The Proclaimers
Best Dance Record: M/A/R/R/S - 'Pump Up The Volume'
Most Wonderful Human Being: Morrissey
Creep Of The Year: Margaret Thatcher
Bad News Of The Year: Another Conservative Victory At The General Election
Safe Sex: Morrissey
Radio: John Peel
Best TV Programme: 'Brookside'
Best Film: 'Angel Heart'
Event Of The Year: Nuclear Agreement

NME Awards 1988
Best Band: The Wedding Present
Solo Artist: Morrissey
Best New Band/Act: The House of Love
Best Single: The House of Love - 'Destroy The Heart'
Best LP: R.E.M. - 'Green'
Best TV Show: 'Brookside'
Ugly Bastard Of The Year: Bros (collective)
Object Of Desire Of The Year: Wendy James
Film Of The Year: 'A Fish Called Wanda'
Favourite NME Cover Of 1988: Morrissey
Best Night Out: The Wedding Present
Radio Show Of The Year: John Peel
Stimulant Of The Year: Acid
Event Of The Year: Mandela's Birthday Bash
Bad News Of The Year: US Election Result
Most Wonderful Human Being: Morrissey
Creep Of the Year: Margaret Thatcher

NME Awards 1989
Band Of The Year: The Stone Roses
LP Of The Year: The Stone Roses - 'The Stone Roses'
Single Of The Year: The Stone Roses - 'Fool's Gold'
Best New Band/Artist: The Stone Roses
Best Solo Artist: Morrissey
Best Dance Record: Happy Mondays - 'WFL'
Hype Of The Year: 'Batman'
Object Of Desire: Wendy James
Radio Show: John Peel
TV Show: 'Blackadder'
Film Of The Year: 'Dead Poets Society'
Fashion Of The Year: Flares
Club/Venue Of The Year: The Haçienda
Event Of The Year (Music): Reading Festival
Event Of The Year (Real Life): Revolution In Eastern Europe
Bastard Of The Year: Margaret Thatcher

NME Awards 1990
Best Single: The Charlatans - 'The Only One I Know'
Best LP: Happy Mondays - 'Pills 'n' Thrills and Bellyaches'
Best New Band/Artist: The Charlatans
Best Band: Happy Mondays
Event Of The Year: Thatcher's Resignation
Solo Artist: Morrissey
Radio Show: John Peel
TV Show: Vic Reeves Big Night Out
Film Of The Year: 'Wild at Heart'
Club Or Venue: Town & Country Club
Hype Of The Year: Teenage Mutant Ninja Turtles
Fashion Item Of The Year: DM Boots
Bastard Of The Year: Saddam Hussein
Object Of Desire: Betty Boo
Word/Phrase: 'You wouldn't let it lie!"

NME Awards 1991
Best Band: R.E.M.
Best LP: Primal Scream - 'Screamadelica'
Best Single: Nirvana - 'Smells Like Teen Spirit'
Best New Band: Kingmaker
Best Venue: Town & Country Club
Best Solo Artist: Morrissey
Bastard Of The Year: Saddam Hussein
Film Of The Year: 'The Silence of the Lambs'
Radio Show Of The Year: John Peel
Fashion Item: DM Boots
Event Of The Year: The release of the hostages
Object Of Desire: Toni Halliday
TV Show: 'Vic Reeves Big Night Out'
Worst Record: Bryan Adams - '(Everything I Do) I Do It for You'
Word/Phrase: "You fat bastard"

NME Awards 1992
Best Band: R.E.M.
Best Album: R.E.M. - 'Automatic For The People'
Solo Artist: Morrissey
Venue: Town & Country Club
Single: Suede - 'The Drowners'
Worst Record: The Shamen - 'Ebeneezer Goode'
New Band: Suede
Event: Bill Clinton winning the US election
Fashion Item: Dr. Martens
Bastard Of The Year: John Major
Hype Of The Year: Madonna's 'Sex'
TV Show Of The Year: 'Have I Got News For You'
Word/ Phrase Of The Year: "Not!"
Film Of The Year: 'Wayne's World'
Radio Show Of The Year: John Peel
Object Of Desire: Toni Halliday

NME Awards 1994
Presenters: Vic Reeves and Bob Mortimer

Best New Band: Elastica
Best Single: Radiohead - 'Creep'
Best Band: Suede
Best Album: The Boo Radleys - 'Giant Steps'
Best Dance Act: Orbital
Godlike Genius Award: John Peel
Live Event: Megadog
Rap Act: Cypress Hill
Best Film: Reservoir Dogs
Worst Record: Meat Loaf - 'I'd Do Anything for Love (But I Won't Do That)'
Best Venue: The Forum
Event of 1993: Unity March
Best Radio Show: John Peel
Hype: Jurassic Park
Best Solo Artist: Björk
Best New Act: Credit To The Nation
Bastard: John Major
Object Of Desire: Björk

NME Awards 1995
Presenters: Tip Top TV

Best LP (voted by NME readers): Blur - 'Parklife'
Best Single (voted by NME readers): Oasis - 'Live Forever'
Best New Band: Oasis
Best Solo Artist: Paul Weller
Worst Record: Whigfield - 'Saturday Night'
Film Of The Year: Pulp Fiction
Best TV Show: Knowing Me Knowing You with Alan Partridge
Best Comedian: Steve Coogan
Most Desirable Human Being: Kylie Minogue
Best Club/Venue: Brixton Academy
NME Album Of The Year: Oasis - 'Definitely Maybe'
NME Singles Of The Year: Blur - 'Girls & Boys'
Philip Hall/ On Award For Best New Act: Gene
Godlike Genius Award For Services To Music: Alan McGee, Creation Records
Live Act Of The Year: Blur
Best Rap Artist: Warren G
Event Of The Year: Glastonbury Festival
Bummer Of The Year: Kurt Cobain's Suicide
Best Video: Blur - 'Parklife'
Best Band: Blur
Best Live Event: Orbital at Glastonbury

NME Awards 1996
Presenters: Vic Reeves and Bob Mortimer

Best Live Act: Oasis
Best Band: Oasis
Best LP: Oasis - '(What's the Story) Morning Glory?'
Best Single: Oasis - 'Wonderwall'
Vibes Award For Best Dance Act: Goldie
Best Dance Act: The Prodigy
Best Solo Artist: Paul Weller
The Special Award For Services Beyond The Call Of Duty: Tony Crean for organising the War Child LP
Album Of The Year: Tricky - 'Maxinquaye'
Single Of The Year: Black Grape - 'Reverend Black Grape'
Worst Record: Robson and Jerome - 'I Believe'
Godlike Genius Award: Michael Eavis
Best Musical Event: Glastonbury Festival
Non- Musical Event: French Nuclear Testing
Best Dressed Person: Jarvis Cocker
Worst Dressed Person: Jarvis Cocker
Best Video: Pulp - 'Common People'
Live Act Of The Year: Pulp
Best TV Programme: Shooting Stars
Best New Band: Supergrass
The Philip Hall Radar Award: Rocket From The Crypt
Best Radio Show: Radio 1's Evening Session
Best Film: The Usual Suspects
Best Comedian: Steve Coogan
Most Desirable Human Being: Liam Gallagher
Git Of The Year: Damon Albarn
Best Venue: Brixton Academy

NME Awards 1997
Best LP (voted for by readers) : Manic Street Preachers - 'Everything Must Go'
Best Single (voted for by readers) : Manic Street Preachers - 'A Design for Life'
Best Live Act: Manic Street Preachers
Musical Moment Of the Year: Skinner, Baddiel and the Lightning Seeds - 'Three Lions'
Best LP: Beck - 'Odelay'
Best Single: Underworld - 'Born Slippy'
Worst Single: Spice Girls - 'Wannabe'
Best Solo Artist: Beck
Best Radio Show: Radio 1 Evening Session
Most Desirable Person: Louise Wener
Best Video: The Prodigy - 'Firestarter'
Biggest Disappointment: The Stone Roses breaking up
Best Club/ Venue: Brixton Academy
Best Band (voted by readers): Oasis
Worst Dressed Person: Liam Gallagher
Worst Band: Blur
Arse Of The Year: Damon Albarn
Musical Event Of The Year: Oasis at Knebworth
Radio 1 Evening Session Of The Year: Suede
Best New Band/Artist: Kula Shaker
Philip Hall/ On Award for Best New Act: Super Furry Animals
Best Dance Act: The Prodigy
Vibes Award For Best Dance Act: Orbital
Best Film: 'Trainspotting'
Best TV Show: 'Shooting Stars'

NME Awards 1998
Presenter: Eddie Izzard

Best Band:The Verve
Best LP: Radiohead - 'OK Computer'
Godlike Genius :- Mark E Smith of The Fall. 
Best Single: The Verve - 'Bitter Sweet Symphony'
Best Solo Artist: Beck
Worst Single: Aqua - 'Barbie Girl'
Best Film: 'The Full Monty'
Musical Event Of 1997 : Glastonbury Festival
Radio 1 Evening Session Of The Year: Radiohead
Best TV Show: 'Shooting Stars'
Best Dance Act: Prodigy
Best Radio Show: Radcliffe & Lard
Best New Band: Embrace
Best Club/Venue: Brixton Academy
Best Music Video: The Verve - 'Bittersweet Symphony'
Best Dance Single: The Prodigy - 'Smack My Bitch Up'
Dickhead Of The Year: Liam Gallagher
Most Desirable Person: Louise Nurding

NME Premier Awards 1999
Best Single: Manic Street Preachers - 'If You Tolerate This Your Children Will Be Next'
Best Band: Manic Street Preachers
Best Music Video: Manic Street Preachers - 'If You Tolerate This Your Children Will Be Next'
Best Album: Manic Street Preachers - 'This Is My Truth Tell Me Yours'
Best New Band: Gomez
Best Radio Show: Mark Radcliffe
Best Dance Act: Fatboy Slim
Best Dance Record: Fatboy Slim - 'The Rockafeller Skank'
Godlike Genius: Massive Attack
Best TV Show: 'South Park'
Best Film: 'Lock, Stock And Two Smoking Barrels'
Musical Event Of The Year: Glastonbury Festival
Best Solo Artist: Robbie Williams
Most Desirable Person: Natalie Imbruglia
Worst Record: Billie Piper - 'Because We Want To'
Dickhead Of The Year: Liam Gallagher
Best Venue: Brixton Academy
The Pop Personality's Brain That Should Be Kept Alive For Posterity: Nicky Wire
The Pop Personality Who Would Make The Best Drugs Czar: Shaun Ryder
The Pop Personality You Would To See On A Blind Date: Marilyn Manson & Billie Piper
The Pop Personality That You'd Most Like As Your Doctor: Natalie Imbruglia
The Pop Personality You Would Most Like To Shopping With: Brian Molko
The Pop Personality You Would Most Like To Cook You A Meal: Tiny Woods
The Pop Personality You Would Most Like To Be Marooned On A Desert Island With: Louise
The Pop Personality You Would Most Like As Prime Minister: Nicky Wire
The Pop Personality That You'd Most Like As Your Driving Instructor: Jay Kay
The Pop Personality You Would Most Like To See In A Ring With Mike Tyson: Billie Piper

NME Premier Awards 2000
Host: Steve Lamacq and Mary Anne Hobbs.

The award party took place at the Mermaid Theatre in London on February 1, 2000.

Philip Hall On Award: Terris
Live Act Of The Year: Mogwai
Best Live Act: Super Furry Animals
On The Decks Awards For Dance Act Of The Year: Death In Vegas
Carling Premier Best New Artist: Muse
Breezeblack Mix Of 1999: Junior Carter
Best Solo Artist: Beck
Best Album Ever: The Stone Roses - 'The Stone Roses'
Best Single Ever: Nirvana - 'Smells Like Teen Spirit'
Total Genius Of The Year: Ali G
Greatest Musical Event Ever: Woodstock
Best Radio Show: Radio 1 Evening Session
Carling Premier Best LP: The Flaming Lips - 'The Soft Bulletin'
NME Album Of The Year: The Flaming Lips - 'The Soft Bulletin'
NME Single Of The Year: Aphex Twin - 'Windowlicker'
Best TV Show: 'The Royle Family'
Musical Event Of The Year: Glastonbury
Best Venue: Brixton Academy
Dickhead Of The Year: Robbie Williams
Best Website: NME.COM
Worst Record Of The Year: The Vengaboys - 'We're Going To Ibiza'
Best Film: 'The Blair Witch Project'
Best DJ: Fatboy Slim
NME.COM Award For Best NME Premier Show Performance: Ooberman
Best Dance Act: The Chemical Brothers
Best Music Video: Blur - 'Coffee & TV'
Best Band: Blur
Best Single: Blur - 'Tender'
Best Band Ever: The Beatles
Godlike Genius Award For Services To Music: Shaun Ryder
Radio 1 Evening Session Session Of The Year: Supergrass
Artist Of The Year: Travis

NME Awards 2001
Host: Peter Kay
Best Band: Radiohead
Best Dance Act: Fatboy Slim
Best Radio Show: Steve Lamacq
Best Metal Act: Marilyn Manson
Best Club DJ: Carl Cox
Radio 1 Evening Session Of The Year: Coldplay
Best New Artist: Coldplay
Best Single: Coldplay - 'Yellow'
NME Carling Awards Tour Award: Amen, JJ72, Alfie
Best Rock Act: U2
Hero Of The Year: Liam Gallagher
Godlike Genius: U2
Best Hip Hop/ Rap Act: Eminem
Villain Of The Year: Robbie Williams
Philip Hall On Award: Starsailor
Best Pop Act: All Saints
Best Club: Cream
Best LP: Primal Scream - 'XTRMNTR'
Best R&B/Soul Act: Kelis
Best Solo Artist: Badly Drawn Boy
Best Film: 'Gladiator'
Musical Event Of The Year: The Carling Weekend
Best TV Programme: 'The League of Gentlemen'

NME Carling Awards 2002
Host: Zane Lowe
Best New Act: The Strokes
Band Of The Year: The Strokes
Album Of The Year: The Strokes - 'Is This It'
Best Pop Act: Kylie Minogue
Best Solo Artist: Ian Brown
Best Video: Radiohead - 'Pyramid Song'
Best Live Act: U2
Outstanding Contribution to NME: The Charlatans
Best Radio 1 Session: The Charlatans
Best Heavy Metal Group: Lostprophets
Honorary NME Carling Tour Award: Lostprophets
Honorary NME Carling Tour Award: Andrew WK
Honorary NME Carling Tour Award: The Coral
Philip Hall On Award: The Coral
Best Radio Show: The Evening Session
Best Hip-Hop/ Rap Act: Missy Elliott
Best R&B/ Soul Act: Aaliyah
Best Dance Act: Basement Jaxx
Best TV Show : 'The Office'
Best Film: 'Moulin Rouge!'
Godlike Genius Award: Nick Kent and Pennie Smith
Best Single: Ash - 'Burn Baby Burn'

NME Carling Awards 2003
Host: Bill Bailey
NME Album Of The Year: Coldplay - 'A Rush of Blood to the Head'
Album Of The Year: Coldplay - 'A Rush of Blood to the Head'
NME Artist Of The Year: Oasis
Best UK Band: Oasis
Best New Band: The Libertines
Best Single: The Vines - 'Get Free'
NME Best Single: Doves - 'There Goes the Fear'
Best International Band: The Hives
The Fuck Me! Award For Innovation: The Polyphonic Spree
Philip Hall Hot New Band Award: Yeah Yeah Yeahs
Best Video: Black Rebel Motorcycle Club - 'Whatever Happened To My Rock And Roll (Punk Song)'
Best Solo Artist: Ryan Adams
Hero Of The Year: Ozzy Osbourne
Best TV Show: 'The Osbournes'
Best Live Venue: London Astoria
Best Haircut: Liam Gallagher
Best Dressed: The Hives
Best Website: NME.com
Event Of The Year: Reading and Leeds Festivals
Villain Of The Year: Robbie Williams
Worst Album: Robbie Williams - 'Escapology'
Worst Single: Robbie Williams - 'Feel'
Worst Band: Nickelback
Worst Haircut: Jack Osbourne
Worst Dressed: Christina Aguilera

NME Awards 2004
Host: Vernon Kay
Best Video: Radiohead - 'There There'
Best Album: Radiohead - 'Hail to the Thief'
Best New Band: Kings Of Leon
Best International Band: Kings Of Leon
Living Legend: Arthur Lee
Best Single: The White Stripes - 'Seven Nation Army'
Best Solo Artist: Ryan Adams
Worst Single: Fast Food Rockers - 'Fast Food Song'
Most Missed: Johnny Cash
Best Website: NME.COM
Hero Of The Year: Pete Doherty
Villain Of The Year: George H. W. Bush
Fight Of The Year : Jack White vs Jason Von Bondie
Waster Of The Year: Pete Doherty
Sexiest Man: Har Mar Superstar
Sexiest Woman: Brody Dalle
Best Haircut: Caleb Followill
Best Live Venue: Brixton Academy
Best Album Artwork: Radiohead 'Hail to the Thief'
Best TV Show: 'The Office'
Best Film: 'The Lord of the Rings: The Return of the King'
The Fuck Me! Award For Innovation: Dizzee Rascal

Shockwaves NME Awards 2005
Host: Simon Pegg and Nick Frost.
 Best Radio Show - Zane Lowe
 Best Solo Artist - Graham Coxon
 Best Live Band - Muse
 Best Track - Franz Ferdinand - "Take Me Out"
 Best Music DVD - Oasis - Definitely Maybe DVD
 Philip Hall Radar Award - Kaiser Chiefs
 Best TV Show - Little Britain
 Best International Band - The Killers
 Best New Band - Razorlight
 Best Video - Green Day - "American Idiot"
 Special Award For Lifelong Service To Music - John Peel
 John Peel Award For Musical Innovation - The Others
 Best Film - Shaun of the Dead
 Best Album - Franz Ferdinand - Franz Ferdinand
 Best Live Event - Glastonbury
 Best British Band - The Libertines
 Godlike Genius Award - New Order & Joy Division
 Best Dressed: Brandon Flowers, of The Killers
 Worst Dressed: Britney Spears
 Best Live Venue: London Carling Brixton Academy
 Best Website: NME.com
 Hero Of The Year: John Peel
 Sexiest Man: Brandon Flowers, of The Killers
 Sexiest Woman: Gwen Stefani
 Worst Album: Insane Clown Posse, for Carnival of Carnage
 Worst Band: Insane Clown Posse

Shockwaves NME Awards 2006
Host: Russell Brand
Best New Band - Arctic Monkeys
Best Video - Oasis - "The Importance of Being Idle"
Best International Band - The Strokes
Best TV Show - Gonzo (on MTV Two)
Best Solo Artist - Kanye West
Philip Hall Radar Award - The Long Blondes
Best Radio Show - Zane Lowe
Best Event - Reading and Leeds Festivals
Best Live Band - Franz Ferdinand
Best Music DVD - Live 8
Best Film - Harry Potter and the Goblet of Fire
John Peel Music Innovation Award - Gorillaz
Best Track - Arctic Monkeys - "I Bet You Look Good on the Dancefloor"
Best Album - Kaiser Chiefs - Employment
Best British Band - Arctic Monkeys
Godlike Genius Award - Ian Brown
Best Website - NME.com
Best Venue - Brixton Academy
Hero of the Year - Bob Geldof
Villain of the Year - George W. Bush
Best Dressed - Ricky Wilson
Worst Dressed - Justin Hawkins
Worst Album - James Blunt - Back to Bedlam
Worst Band - Son of Dork
Sexiest Man - Pete Doherty
Sexiest Woman - Madonna

Shockwaves NME Awards 2007
Host: Lauren Laverne
Godlike Genius Award - Primal Scream
Best British Band - Muse
Best International Band - My Chemical Romance
Best Solo Artist - Jamie T
Best Live Band - Kasabian
Best New Band -  Klaxons
Best Album - Arctic Monkeys - Whatever People Say I Am, That's What I'm Not
Best Track - The View - "Wasted Little DJs"
Best Video - The Killers - "Bones"
Best Music DVD - Arctic Monkeys - Scummy Man
Best Live Event - Carling Weekend : Reading and Leeds Festivals
Best TV Show - The Mighty Boosh
Best Radio Show - Zane Lowe (BBC Radio 1)
Best Film - Pirates of the Caribbean: Dead Man's Chest
Sexiest Woman - Kate Moss
Sexiest Man - Matt Bellamy (Muse)
Worst Album - Robbie Williams - Rudebox
Worst Band -  Panic! At The Disco
Best Dressed - Faris Rotter (The Horrors)
Worst Dressed - Jonathan Ross
Hero of the year - Gerard Way (My Chemical Romance)
Villain of the Year - George W. Bush
Best Live Venue - Carling Brixton Academy
Best Website (excluding NME.com) - YouTube
John Peel Award For Musical Innovation - Enter Shikari
Philip Hall Radar Award - The Twang

Shockwaves NME Awards 2008
The award party took place in indigO2 next to The O2 Arena on 28 February 2008.

Host: Matt Horne and James Corden

Godlike Genius Award - Manic Street Preachers
Best British Band - Arctic Monkeys
Best International Band - The Killers
Best Solo Artist - Kate Nash
Best Live Band - Muse
Best New Band -  The Enemy
Best Album - Klaxons - Myths of the Near Future
Best Track - Arctic Monkeys - "Fluorescent Adolescent"
Best Dancefloor Filler - The Wombats - "Let's Dance to Joy Division"
Best Video - Arctic Monkeys - "Teddy Picker"
Best Music DVD - Nirvana - MTV Unplugged in New York
Best Live Event - Carling Weekend: Reading and Leeds Festivals
Best TV Show - The Mighty Boosh
Best Radio Show - Zane Lowe (BBC Radio 1)
Best Film - Control
Sexiest Woman - Kylie Minogue
Sexiest Man - Noel Fielding
Worst Album - Britney Spears - Blackout
Worst Band -  The Hoosiers
Best Dressed - Noel Fielding
Worst Dressed - Amy Winehouse
Hero of the year - Pete Doherty
Villain of the Year - George W. Bush
Best Live Venue - Wembley Stadium
Best Website (excluding NME.com) - Facebook
John Peel Award For Musical Innovation - Radiohead
Philip Hall Radar Award - Glasvegas

NME Awards USA
Host: Jim Jeffries & Har Mar Superstar

The award party took place at the El Rey Theatre on 23 April 2008.

The winners were:
Best American Alternative/Indie Band: The Killers
Foo Fighters
Kings of Leon
My Chemical Romance
The White Stripes
Best American Alternative/Indie Live Act: My Chemical Romance
Foo Fighters
The Killers
Kings of Leon
Queens of the Stone Age
Best American Alternative/Indie Solo Artist: Albert Hammond Jr.
Andrew Bird
Beck
Cat Power
Ryan Adams
Best American Alternative/Indie New Band: Vampire Weekend
Band of Horses
Black Kids
MGMT
Paramore
Best American Alternative/Indie New Live Act: Vampire Weekend
Band of Horses
Black Kids
MGMT
Santigold
Best American Alternative/Indie New Solo Artist: Mark Ronson
Cass McCombs
Sam Sparro
Santigold
Seasick Steve
Best American Alternative/Indie Album: Foo Fighters, Echoes, Silence, Patience & Grace
The Hold Steady, Boys and Girls in America
The Killers, Sawdust
Kings of Leon, Because of the Times
The White Stripes, Icky Thump
Best American Alternative/Indie Track: The Killers, "Tranquilize"
Foo Fighters, "The Pretender"
LCD Soundsystem, "All My Friends"
My Chemical Romance, "Teenagers"
The White Stripes, "Icky Thump"
Best International Alternative/Indie Band: Arcade Fire
Arctic Monkeys
Muse
Oasis
Radiohead
Best International Alternative/Indie Live Act: Arcade Fire
Arctic Monkeys
The Cribs
Kaiser Chiefs
Muse
Best International Alternative/Indie Solo Artist: Kate Nash
Amy Winehouse
Feist
Jamie T
M.I.A.
Best International Alternative/Indie New Band: Klaxons
The Enemy
Foals
The Last Shadow Puppets
The Wombats
Best International Alternative/Indie New Live Act: Klaxons
CSS
Foals
The Pigeon Detectives
The Wombats
Best International Alternative/Indie New Solo Artist: Kate Nash
Dev Hynes
Duffy
Jack Peñate
Lily Allen
Best International Alternative/Indie Album: Arctic Monkeys, Favourite Worst Nightmare
Arcade Fire, Neon Bible
Babyshambles, Shotter's Nation
Klaxons, Myths of the Near Future
Radiohead, In Rainbows
Best International Alternative/Indie Track: Klaxons, "Golden Skans"
Arcade Fire, "Intervention"
Arctic Monkeys, "Teddy Picker"
Bloc Party, "Flux"
Kate Nash, "Foundations"
Best Alternative/Indie Music Video: Justice, "D.A.N.C.E."
Arctic Monkeys, "Fluorescent Adolescent"
Foo Fighters, "Long Road to Ruin"
The Killers, "Tranquilize"
Oasis, "Lord Don't Slow Me Down"
Best Film: Juno
Control
No Country for Old Men
The Simpsons Movie
There Will Be Blood
Best Television: Heroes
Grey's Anatomy
Lost
The Mighty Boosh
The Office
Best Alternative/Indie Breakthrough Artist: Santigold
Best Alternative/Indie Breakthrough Track: MGMT, "Time to Pretend"
Classic Album: The Lemonheads, It's a Shame About Ray
Godlike Genius Award: Jane's Addiction
Inspiration Award: Mick Jones

Shockwaves NME Awards 2009
Host: Mark Watson

The awards took place at the Brixton Academy on 25 February 2009.

The 2009 winners were:

 Godlike Genius Award - The Cure
 Outstanding Contribution To Music - Elbow
 Best British Band - Oasis
 Best International Band - The Killers
 Best Solo Artist - Pete Doherty
 Best Live Band - Muse
 Best New Band - MGMT
 Best Album - Kings Of Leon – Only By The Night
 Best Track - MGMT – "Time to Pretend"
 Best Dancefloor Filler - Dizzee Rascal & Calvin Harris – "Dance Wiv Me"
 Best Video - The Last Shadow Puppets – "My Mistakes Were Made For You"
 Best DVD - Arctic Monkeys – Arctic Monkeys Live at the Apollo
 Best Live Event - Glastonbury Festival
 Best TV Show - The Mighty Boosh
 Worst TV Show - Big Brother
 Best Website - youtube.com
 Best Venue - London Astoria
 Worst Album - Jonas Brothers - A Little Bit Longer
 Worst Band - Jonas Brothers
 Villain of the Year - George W. Bush
 Best Dressed - Alexa Chung
 Worst Dressed - Amy Winehouse
 Sexiest Man - Matt Bellamy
 Sexiest Woman - Hayley Williams
 Best Album Artwork - Muse - HAARP
 Best Blog - Noel Gallagher
 Philip Hall Radar Award - The Big Pink

Shockwaves NME Awards 2010
Host: Jarvis Cocker

Performances:
 Kasabian with Noel Fielding - "Vlad the Impaler"
 The Specials - "Too Much Too Young"
 Biffy Clyro featuring Marina Diamandis - "Many of Horror"
 The Big Pink with Lily Allen - "Dominos"

The awards took place at the Brixton Academy on 24 February 2010.

The 2010 winners were:

Godlike Genius Award - Paul Weller
Outstanding Contribution To Music - The Specials
Best British Band - Muse
Best International Band - Paramore
Best Solo Artist - Jamie T
Best New Band - Bombay Bicycle Club
Best Live Band - Arctic Monkeys
Best Album - Kasabian - West Ryder Pauper Lunatic Asylum
Best Track - The Big Pink - "Dominos"
Best Video - Biffy Clyro - "The Captain"
Best Live Event - Blur, Hyde Park
Best Festival - Glastonbury Festival
Best TV Show - The Inbetweeners
Best Film - Inglourious Basterds
Best Dancefloor Filler - La Roux - "In For The Kill (Skream Remix)"
Best DVD - Boosh Live - Future Sailors Tour
Hero of the Year - Rage Against the Machine
Villain of the Year - Kanye West
Best Dressed - Lady Gaga
Worst Dressed - Lady Gaga
Worst Album - Jonas Brothers - Lines, Vines and Trying Times
Worst Band - Jonas Brothers
Hottest Man - Matt Bellamy
Hottest Woman - Karen O
Best Website - Muse.mu
Best Album Artwork - Kasabian - West Ryder Pauper Lunatic Asylum
Best Band Blog - Radiohead (Radiohead.com/deadairspace)
Giving It Back Fan Award - Lily Allen for her Twitter ticket treasure hunt
Phillip Hall Radar Award - The Drums

Shockwaves NME Awards 2011
Host: Angelos Epithemiou

Performances: 
My Chemical Romance - "Na Na Na (Na Na Na Na Na Na Na Na Na)"
Hurts - "Wonderful Life"
PJ Harvey - "The Words That Maketh Murder"
Crystal Castles - "Baptism"
Foo Fighters - The band were asked to play a 3-song set, but instead decided to play a 2-hour set. Opening with a cover of "Young Man Blues" with Roger Daltrey of The Who on vocals, they then played their latest album Wasting Light in full, followed by a compilation of 9 their biggest hits.

The awards took place at the Brixton Academy on 23 February 2011.

The 2011 winners were:

Godlike Genius Award - Dave Grohl
John Peel Award for Innovation - Crystal Castles
Philip Hall Radar Award - The Naked And Famous
Outstanding Contribution To Music - PJ Harvey
Best British Band - Muse
Best International Band - My Chemical Romance
Best Solo Artist - Laura Marling
Best New Band - Hurts
Best Live Band - Biffy Clyro
Best Album - Arcade Fire – The Suburbs
Best Track - Foals – "Spanish Sahara"
Best Video - My Chemical Romance – "Na Na Na (Na Na Na Na Na Na Na Na Na)"
Best Festival - Glastonbury
Best TV Show - Skins
Best Film - Inception
Best Dancefloor Filler - Professor Green – "Jungle"
Hero of the Year - Lady Gaga
Villain of the Year - David Cameron
Most Stylish - Brandon Flowers
Least Stylish - Justin Bieber
Worst Album - Justin Bieber – My World
Worst Band - Jonas Brothers
Hottest Man - Matt Bellamy
Hottest Woman - Alison Mosshart
Best Album Artwork - Klaxons – Surfing The Void
Best Band Blog or Twitter - Hayley Williams
Best Book - John Lydon – Mr Rotten's Scrapbook
Best Small Festival (50,000 capacity or lower) - RockNess

NME Awards 2012

 Godlike Genius Award – Noel Gallagher
 Outstanding Contribution to Music – Pulp
 Best British Band – Kasabian
 Best International Band – Foo Fighters
 Best Solo Artist – Florence + the Machine
 Best New Band – The Vaccines
 Best Live Band – Arctic Monkeys
 Best Album – The Horrors – Skying
 Best Track – Florence + the Machine – Shake It Out
 Best Video – Hurts – Sunday
 Best Festival – Glastonbury Festival
 Best TV Show – Fresh Meat
 Best Film – Submarine
 Best Music Film – Back and Forth
 Dancefloor Anthem – Katy B – Broken Record
 Hero of the Year – Matt Bellamy
 Villain of the Year – Justin Bieber
 Worst Album – Justin Bieber - Under the Mistletoe
 Worst Band – One Direction
 Hottest Man – Jared Leto
 Hottest Woman – Hayley Williams
 Best Album Artwork – Friendly Fires - Pala
 Best Band Blog or Twitter – @Lady Gaga (Lady Gaga)
 Most Dedicated Fans – Muse
 Best Book – Noel Fielding – The Scribblings of a Madcap Shambleton
 Best Small Festival – RockNess
 Best Reissue – The Smiths – Complete Re-issues
 Greatest Music Moment of the Year – The Stone Roses reunite

NME Awards 2013 
Host: Russell Kane

 Godlike Genius Award – Johnny Marr
 Philip Hall Radar Award – The Child of Lov
 Teenage Cancer Trust Outstanding Contribution to Music – The Cribs
 Best British Band – One Direction
 Best International Band – The Killers
 Best Solo Artist – Florence + the Machine
 Best New Band – Palma Violets
 Best Live Band – The Rolling Stones
 Best Album – The Maccabees – Given to the Wild
 Best Track – Foals – Inhaler
 Best Video – Arctic Monkeys – R U Mine?
 Best Festival – Reading and Leeds Festivals
 Best TV Show – Fresh Meat
 Best Film – The Hobbit: An Unexpected Journey
 Best Music Film – Crossfire Hurricane
 Dancefloor Anthem – Calvin Harris feat. Florence Welch – Sweet Nothing
 Hero of the Year – Barack Obama
 Villain of the Year – Harry Styles
 Worst Band – One Direction
 Hottest Man – Matthew Bellamy
 Hottest Woman – Amy Lee
 Best Band Blog or Twitter – @babyhaim (Alana Haim)
 Best Fan Community – Muse
 Best Book – Mike Skinner – The Story of the Streets 
 Best Small Festival – Festival No 6
 Best Reissue – Blur – 21
 Greatest Music Moment of the Year – 2012 Summer Olympics opening ceremony

NME Awards 2014 
Host: Huw Stephens

 Godlike Genius Award - Blondie
 Songwriters’ Songwriter - Paul McCartney
 Award For Innovation - Damon Albarn
 Teenage Cancer Trust Outstanding Contribution to Music Award - Belle and Sebastian
 Best British Band - Arctic Monkeys
 Best International Band - Haim
 Best Solo Artist - Lily Allen
 Best New Band - Drenge
 Best Live Band - One Direction
 Best Album - Arctic Monkeys - AM
 Best Track - Disclosure - "White Noise"
 Best Music Video - Eagulls - "Nerve Endings"
 Best Festival - Glastonbury Festival
 Best TV Show - Breaking Bad
 Best Music Film - The Stone Roses: Made of Stone
 Philip Hall Radar Award - Fat White Family
 Best Reissue - The Clash - Sound System
 Best Band Blog Or Twitter - Alana Haim, Haim
 Best Book - Morrissey - Autobiography
 Best Small Festival - Sŵn
 Best Fan Community - Arctic Monkeys
 Music Moment Of The Year - Noel and Damon come together for Teenage Cancer Trust
 Worst Band - The 1975
 Hero Of The Year - Alex Turner
 Villain Of The Year - Harry Styles

NME Awards 2015 

Godlike Genius Award: Suede
Best British Band: Kasabian
Best Album: Kasabian – 48:13
Best International Band: Foo Fighters
Best Live Band: Royal Blood
Best New Band: Royal Blood
Best Solo Artist: Jake Bugg
Best Festival: Glastonbury
Best Track: Jamie T – "Zombie"
Best Video: Jamie T – "Zombie"
Best Music Film: Pulp: A Film About Life, Death and Supermarkets
Best Film: Northern Soul
Best TV Show: Game of Thrones
Dancefloor Filler: Iggy Azalea featuring Charli XCX – "Fancy"
Worst Band: 5 Seconds of Summer
Villain of the Year: Nigel Farage
Hero of the Year: Alex Turner
Music Moment of the Year: Jamie T's comeback
Best Fan Community: Muse
Small Festival of the Year: Liverpool Psych Fest
Book of the Year: Viv Albertine – Clothes, Clothes, Clothes. Music, Music, Music. Boys, Boys, Boys
Reissue of the Year: Manic Street Preachers – The Holy Bible
Best Band Social Media: Liam Gallagher's Twitter
Philip Hall Radar Award: Dean Blunt

NME Awards 2016 
 Godlike Genius Award: Coldplay
 Best British Band: The Maccabees
 Best International Band: Run the Jewels
 Best New Artist: Rat Boy
 Best British Solo Artist: Charli XCX
 Best International Solo Artist: Taylor Swift
 Best Live Band: Wolf Alice
 Best Album: Foals – What Went Down
 Best Track: Wolf Alice – "Giant Peach"
 Best TV Show: This is England '90
 Best Film: Beasts of No Nation
 Best Music Film: Blur: New World Towers
 Best Music Video: Slaves – "Cheer Up London"
 Best Actor: Idris Elba
 Best Actress: Vicky McClure
 Best Reissue: David Bowie – Five Years (1969–1973)
 Best Book: Patti Smith – M Train
 Best Festival: Glastonbury
 Best Small Festival: End of the Road
 Music Moment of the Year: The Libertines secret Glastonbury set
 Best Fan Community: The Libertines
 Worst Band: 5 Seconds of Summer
 Villain of the Year: Donald Trump
 Hero of the Year: Dave Grohl
 Vlogger of the Year: KSI
 Innovation Award: Bring Me the Horizon

NME Awards 2017 
 Godlike Genius Award: Pet Shop Boys
 Best British Band: Biffy Clyro
 Best International Band: Metallica
 Best New Artist: Dua Lipa
 Best British Female Artist: M.I.A.
 Best British Male Artist: Skepta
 Best International Female Artist: Christine and the Queens
 Best International Male Artist: Frank Ocean
 Best Festival Headliner: Adele
 Best Live Band: The 1975
 Best Album: Bastille – Wild World
 Best Track: Christine and the Queens – "Tilted"
 Best TV Show: Fleabag
 Best Film: My Scientology Movie
 Best Music Film: Oasis: Supersonic
 Best Music Video: Slaves – "Consume or Be Consumed"
 Best Reissue: Oasis – Be Here Now
 Best Book: Johnny Marr – Set the Boy Free
 Best Festival: Glastonbury Festival
 Best Small Festival: End of the Road
 Music Moment of the Year: Coldplay's Viola Beach tribute at Glastonbury
 Worst Band: 5 Seconds of Summer
 Villain of the Year: Nigel Farage
 Hero of the Year: Beyoncé
 Outstanding Contribution To Music: Wiley

NME Awards 2018 
 Godlike Genius Award: Liam Gallagher
 Best British Band: alt-J
 Best New Artist: Stefflon Don
 Best Live Artist: Kasabian
 Best Track: Charli XCX - "Boys"
 Best International Band: Haim
 Best Mixtape: Avelino - "No Bullshit"
 Best Album: J Hus - "Common Sense"
 Best Collaboration: Craig David ft. Bastille - "I Know You"
 Best Festival: Glastonbury Festival
 Best Film: Baby Driver
 Best Music Video: The Big Moon - "Sucker"
 Under the Radar Award - Pale Waves
 Best Festival Headliner - Muse
 Best International Solo Artist: Lorde
 NME Icon: Shirley Manson
 NME Innovation Award: Boy Better Know
 Best Book: Wiley - Eskiboy
 Best TV Show: Stranger Things
 Best Reissue: Radiohead - "OK Computer OKNOTOK 1997 2017"
 Best Small Festival: Festival N°6
 Music Moment of the Year: One Love Manchester
 Best Music Film: Gaga: Five Foot Two
 Hero of the Year: Ariana Grande
 Villain of the Year: Piers Morgan

NME Awards 2020 

 Godlike Genius Award: Emily Eavis
 Songwriter of the Decade: Robyn
 Best British Band: The 1975
 Best Band in the World: Slipknot
 Band of the Decade: The 1975
 Best New British Act: Easy Life
 Best New Act in the World: Clairo
 Best British Song: AJ Tracey - "Ladbroke Grove"
 Best Song in the World: Billie Eilish - "Bad Guy"
 Best British Album: Little Simz - Grey Area
 Best Album in the World: Lana Del Rey - Norman Fucking Rockwell!
 Best British Solo Act: FKA twigs
 Best Solo Act in the World: Taylor Swift
 Best Live Act: Foals
 Best Collaboration: Mura Masa and Slowthai - "Deal Wiv It"
 Best British Festival: Glastonbury
 Best Festival in the World: Glastonbury
 Best Small Festival: End of the Road
 Best Film: Blue Story
 Best Film Actor: Taron Egerton
 Best Music Video: Yungblud - "Original Me"
 Under the Radar Award: Beabadoobee
 Best Festival Headliner: The Cure
 NME Icon: Courtney Love
 Best Book: Debbie Harry - Face It: A Memoir
 Best TV Show: Peaky Blinders
 Best TV Actor: Jessica Barden
 Best Reissue: Muse - Origin of Muse
 Best Music Film: Liam Gallagher - As It Was
 Best Podcast: Have You Heard George's Podcast?
 Best Game: Star Wars Jedi: Fallen Order
 Best Music Moment of the year: BTS

References

NME
NME Award winners
Lists of British award winners
New Musical Express